This is a list of amateur mathematicians—people whose primary vocation did not involve mathematics (or any similar discipline) yet made notable, and sometimes important, contributions to the field of mathematics.

Ahmes (scribe)
Ashutosh Mukherjee (lawyer)
Robert Ammann (programmer and postal worker)
John Arbuthnot (surgeon and author)
Jean-Robert Argand (shopkeeper)
Leon Bankoff (Beverly Hills dentist)
Rev. Thomas Bayes (Presbyterian minister)
Andrew Beal (businessman)
Isaac Beeckman (candlemaker)
Chester Ittner Bliss (biologist)
Napoléon Bonaparte (general)
Mary Everest Boole (homemaker, librarian)
William Bourne (innkeeper)
Nathaniel Bowditch (indentured bookkeeper)
Achille Brocot (clockmaker)
Jost Bürgi (clockmaker)
Marvin Ray Burns (veteran)
Gerolamo Cardano (medical doctor)
D. G. Champernowne (college student)
Thomas Clausen (technical assistant)
Sir James Cockle (judge)
Federico Commandino (medical doctor)
William Crabtree (merchant)
Nathan Daboll (cooper)
Felix Delastelle (bonded warehouseman)
Martin Demaine (goldsmith and glass artist)
Humphry Ditton (minister)
Harvey Dubner (engineer)
Henry Dudeney (civil servant)
Albrecht Dürer (painter)
Greg Egan (writer)
M. C. Escher (graphic artist)
Eugène Ehrhart (mathematics teacher)
John Ernest (painter)
Pasquale Joseph Federico (patent attorney)
Pierre de Fermat (lawyer)
Sarah Flannery (high school student)
Reo Fortune (anthropologist)
John G.F. Francis (research assistant)
Benjamin Franklin (printer and diplomat)
Bernard Frenicle de Bessy
Gemma Frisius (medical doctor)
Britney Gallivan (high school student)
James Garfield (United States President)
Antoine Gombaud (essayist)
Thorold Gosset (lawyer)
Jørgen Pedersen Gram (actuary)
Hermann Grassmann (school teacher)
John Graunt (haberdasher)
George Green (miller)
Aubrey de Grey (gerontologist)
André-Michel Guerry (lawyer)
Charles James Hargreave (judge)
Oliver Heaviside (telegraph operator)
Kurt Heegner (private scholar)
John R. Hendricks (meteorologist)
Anthony Hill (painter)
Paul Jaccard (botanist)
Alfred Bray Kempe (lawyer)
Thomas Kirkman (church rector)
Laurence Monroe Klauber (herpetologist)
Harry Lindgren (civil servant)
Ada Lovelace (countess)
Lu Jiaxi (high school physics teacher)
Kenneth McIntyre (lawyer)
Danica McKellar (actress)
Anderson Gray McKendrick (medical doctor)
Marin Mersenne (theologian)
Florence Nightingale (nurse and statistician)
George Phillips Odom Jr. (artist)
B. Nicolò I. Paganini (schoolboy) 
Pāṇini (linguist)
Blaise Pascal (heir, private scholar)
Padmakumar (technician)
Henry Perigal (stockbroker)
Kenneth Perko (lawyer)
Ivan Pervushin (priest)
Piero della Francesca (painter)
Pingala (musician)
William Playfair (draftsman)
Henry Cabourn Pocklington (schoolmaster)
François Proth (farmer)
Ramchundra (head master)
Marjorie Rice (homemaker)
Olinde Rodrigues (banker, social reformer)
Lee Sallows (engineer)
Robert Schlaifer (classics scholar)
Robert Schneider (musician and record producer)
William Shanks (landlord)
Abraham Sharp (schoolmaster)
Simon Stevin (merchants clerk)
Alicia Boole Stott (secretary)
Paul Tannery (tobacco factory director)
Gaston Tarry (civil servant)
Niccolò Fontana Tartaglia (bookkeeper)
Nikola Tesla (engineer, inventor)
Sébastien Truchet (monk)
Franciscus Vieta (lawyer)
Giordano Vitale (soldier)
Walter Frank Raphael Weldon (evolutionary biologist)
Johannes Werner (parish priest)
Caspar Wessel (lawyer)
Leo Wiener (linguist)
Frank Wilcoxon (chemist)
Edouard Zeckendorf (medical doctor)

References

Amateur mathematicians